Paula Schnurr (born January 15, 1964 in Kirkland Lake, Ontario) is a retired Canadian middle-distance runner who competed primarily in the 1500 meters. She represented her country at the 1992 and 1996 Summer Olympics as well as two indoor World Championships. In addition, she won the silver medal at the 1994 Commonwealth Games.

Competition record

Personal bests
Outdoor
800 meters – 2:03.00 (Windsor 1996)
1500 meters – 4:04.80 (Barcelona 1992)
One mile – 4:30.62 (Gateshead 1994)
3000 meters – 9:05.47 (Ottawa 1989)
Indoor
1000 meters – 2:41.70 (North York 1993)
1500 meters – 4:11.80 (Hamilton 1994)
One mile – 4:33.95 (New York 1993)

References

External links
All-Athletics profile
Canadian Olympic Committee bio

1964 births
Living people
Sportspeople from Kirkland Lake
Canadian female middle-distance runners
Olympic track and field athletes of Canada
Athletes (track and field) at the 1992 Summer Olympics
Athletes (track and field) at the 1996 Summer Olympics
Commonwealth Games medallists in athletics
Athletes (track and field) at the 1994 Commonwealth Games
Commonwealth Games silver medallists for Canada
Medallists at the 1994 Commonwealth Games